Sekolah Menengah Kebangsaan Alam Megah (SMKAM) or SMK Alam Megah is a public national secondary school in Shah Alam, Malaysia

The school opened on December 1, 1993, with 145 students and 6 teachers. In recent years, the number of students reached 1378 students . HJ Kamali Bin Murid became the school's principal in 2014.

External links 
 SMK Alam Megah's Official Blog
 SMK Alam Megah's 5S
 PSS Megah Bestari

Schools in Selangor